Mary Catherine Garrison (born December 19, 1973) is an American actress known for her roles in Veep and Somebody Somewhere.

Early life and education 
Born in Clarksdale, Mississippi, Garrison earned a Bachelor of Fine Arts degree in acting from the University of Evansville and a Master of Fine Arts in acting from the University of California, San Diego.

Career 
In addition to her television and film roles, Garrison has also appeared in Broadway productions of The Man Who Came to Dinner, Assassins, Rabbit Hole, Top Girls, Accent on Youth, and Lend Me a Tenor.

Personal life 
Garrison and her husband, Marshall Wood, live in Lynchburg, Virginia. She previously lived in Los Angeles and Brooklyn. In addition to acting, Garrison operates an online pottery business.

Filmography

Film

Television

References 

Living people
Actresses from Mississippi
1973 births
University of Evansville alumni
University of California, San Diego alumni
People from Clarksdale, Mississippi
People from Lynchburg, Virginia